Arnold C. Otto was a member of the Wisconsin State Assembly.

Biography
Otto was born on July 27, 1887. He would graduate from Kaukauna High School in Kaukauna, Wisconsin, as well as from what was then Lawrence College and the George Washington University Law School. Otto served as an officer in the District of Columbia National Guard and assisted in organizing the Legal Aid Society of Milwaukee. On June 25, 1935, he married Madeline Bird. He died on March 17, 1965.

Electoral career
Otto was elected to the Assembly in 1916 and 1918. He was a Republican.

References

People from Kaukauna, Wisconsin
Politicians from Milwaukee
Republican Party members of the Wisconsin State Assembly
Military personnel from Wisconsin
National Guard (United States) officers
Wisconsin lawyers
Lawrence University alumni
George Washington University Law School alumni
1887 births
1965 deaths
20th-century American politicians